The Qingshui Geothermal Park is a geothermal in Datong Township, Yilan County, Taiwan.

History
The park used to be the old workstation of CPC Corporation. The park was closed from 13 May until 8 June 2021 due to the surging of COVID-19 pandemic.

Geology
The park is located at the valley of the Qingshui River. The water from the park has a temperature of 95–104°C.

Architecture
The park consists of cooking pools, foot baths, rest area, selling area etc.

See also
 Geothermal energy in Taiwan

References

Landforms of Yilan County, Taiwan
Tourist attractions in Yilan County, Taiwan